Cleveland County may refer to:

 Cleveland County, Arkansas, named for Grover Cleveland, president of the United States
 Cleveland County, North Carolina, named for Benjamin Cleveland, a colonel in the American Revolutionary War
 Cleveland County, Oklahoma, named for Grover Cleveland
 Cleveland (county), a former county in England, now Tees Valley